Grégoire de Fournas de Brosse (born 19 March 1985) is a French politician and winegrower who has represented the 5th constituency of the Gironde department in the National Assembly since 2022. A member of the National Rally (RN), he has also been a municipal councillor of Pauillac since 2020. De Fournas held a seat in the Departmental Council of Gironde for the canton of Le Nord-Médoc from 2015 to 2021.

Biography
Grégoire de Fournas holds Brevet de technicien supérieur qualifications in agricultural studies, viticulture and oenology. His family runs the Château Vieux Cassan vineyard in Saint-Germain-d'Esteuil of which he became the director in 2010.

He was elected a departmental councillor of Gironde in the canton of Le Nord-Médoc in 2015. He campaigned against the construction of a nearby windfarm. In 2020, he was elected a municipal councillor of Pauillac.

In the 2022 legislative election, he was elected in the 5th constituency of Gironde unseating La République En Marche! (LREM) representative Benoît Simian. A profile in Libération described De Fournas as a "staunch defender of hunting, fiercely opposed to wind turbines, the installations of which he virulently combats."

2022 ban from Parliament
On 3 November 2022, during the government question period in the National Assembly, De Fournas interrupted fellow representative Carlos Martens Bilongo's remarks on the situation of migrants on the SOS Méditerranée ship Ocean Viking, shouting "Qu'il retourne en Afrique!" which can be translated either to "Let him go back to Africa!" or "Let it go back to Africa!"

De Fournas's outburst was deemed racist by other MPs, though it was unclear whether he was referring to Bilongo or the ship. De Fournas rejected the racism accusation, saying he was referring to the ship. National Assembly President Yaël Braun-Pivet suspended the meeting following the remarks. De Fournas later received a 15-day ban from the National Assembly and had his pay docked.

References

1985 births
Living people
National Rally (France) politicians
People from Gironde
Politicians from Nouvelle-Aquitaine
Deputies of the 16th National Assembly of the French Fifth Republic
Departmental councillors (France)
French winemakers
Racism in France